Don't Stop Movin' may refer to:

 "Don't Stop Movin'" (S Club 7 song)
 Don't Stop Movin' (S Club album), a US-only album by S Club, named for the song
 "Don't Stop Movin'" (Livin' Joy song)
 ''Don't Stop Movin''' (Livin' Joy album)